The Critic is an upcoming British period thriller film directed by Anand Tucker from a screenplay written by Patrick Marber, based on the 2015 novel Curtain Call by Anthony Quinn.

Premise
In 1934 London, an actress finds herself in a dark situation involving a theatre critic and his paper's editor.

Cast
 Ian McKellen as Jimmy Erskine
 Gemma Arterton as Nina Land
 Mark Strong as David Brooke
 Lesley Manville as Annabel Land
 Romola Garai as Madeleine Farewell 
 Ben Barnes as Stephen Wyley
 Alfred Enoch as Tom Tunner
 Nikesh Patel as Ferdy Harwood
 Jay Simpson as Slyfield

Production
It was announced in November 2020 that Colin Firth, Gemma Arterton, Simon Russell Beale and Paapa Essiedu were set to star in the film, at the time titled Curtain Call like the source novel, with Anand Tucker directing and Patrick Marber writing the screenplay. By February 2021, filming was expected to begin later that year.

In June 2022, the film was retitled The Critic, with Firth, Beale and Essiedu no longer involved. Ian McKellen, Mark Strong, Lesley Manville, Romola Garai, Ben Barnes and Alfred Enoch were announced to be joining Arterton, and production began in London.

References

External links
  

Upcoming films
British historical thriller films
Films based on British novels
Films based on mystery novels
Films based on thriller novels
Films directed by Anand Tucker
Films set in 1934
Films set in London
Films shot in London
Upcoming English-language films